Michael Zorek is an American film and television actor who has appeared in films and television series such as Private School, Family Ties, The Facts of Life, Hot Moves, The Woman in Red, Camp Nowhere and Teen Wolf Too.

Personal life
In June 2002, Zorek was featured in an article in The New York Times about life as a stay-at-home father after leaving his job as an account executive at a Manhattan public relations firm.  In May 2013, The Huffington Post published a follow up article by the same author of The New York Times piece, Lisa Belkin.

Zorek's son Jeremy is also an actor and performed in a 2011 national tour of Billy Elliot, and his daughter Diana has acted in an AT&T commercial.

Filmography

Film

Television

References

External links

American male film actors
American male television actors
1960 births
Living people
Male actors from New York City